Danilo Tognon (born October 9, 1937) is an Italian sprint canoer who competed in the early 1960s. He was eliminated in the semifinals of the C-1 1000 m event at the 1960 Summer Olympics in Rome.

References
Sports-reference.com profile

1937 births
Canoeists at the 1960 Summer Olympics
Italian male canoeists
Living people
Olympic canoeists of Italy
Place of birth missing (living people)
20th-century Italian people